Kenneth Richard McKinnon  was the second vice-chancellor of the University of Wollongong between 1981 and 1994. He also served as interim vice-chancellor of James Cook University in 1997 and Charles Darwin University from 2002 to 2003, where he was responsible for the name change from Northern Territory University. The main Law building and co-purpose lecture theatre at the University of Wollongong is named in honour of his contribution during this time.

McKinnon was made an Officer of the Order of Australia in the 1995 Queen's Birthday Honours for "service to education, to the community and to the arts".

References

 

Living people
Year of birth missing (living people)
Vice Chancellors of the University of Wollongong
Academic staff of Charles Darwin University
Officers of the Order of Australia